Robert J. "Bob" Coy  (born November 27, 1955) is the founder and former Senior Pastor of Calvary Chapel Fort Lauderdale in Fort Lauderdale, Florida.

On April 3, 2014, Coy resigned as Senior Pastor of Calvary Chapel Fort Lauderdale. He admitted to committing adultery and having an addiction to pornography. In 2017, he was accused of sexually abusing a four-year-old girl. His media ministry, which includes radio, television, and digital media was subsequently terminated.

Biography 
Coy was born in Royal Oak, Michigan on November 27, 1955.

At 21 years old, Coy got a job at Capitol Records in Detroit. "I was living the life of sex, drugs, and rock n roll," he said. Coy abused drugs and alcohol. After multiple traffic tickets, some for driving under the influence, he lost his license. At 24 years old, soon after he lost his license, a band manager reported Coy for offering drugs to a band member. Coy moved to Las Vegas and got a job in property management. He later became an entertainment director at a casino with an, "All-Girl Revue." According to Coy, this, "is another way of saying I ran a strip club." Until 1981, Coy continued to live a life of sex and drugs. On the day after Christmas, his brother Jim (who had recently married and "got religion") let him crash in his living room after a wild party.

Jim gave Bob a pillow, blanket, and Bible. Bob threw the Bible at Jim and said "Will you shut up with your Jesus stuff?" The Bible still on the floor, Jim and his wife went to bed. Bob says he couldn't sleep because the Bible was "calling out to him." He opened it to the Gospel of John and began reading; when he got to verse 3:16, he began to weep uncontrollably.

Jim and his wife entered the room and Jim announced: "God just woke me up and told me I'm supposed to pray for you."Soon afterward, Coy quit his job at the casino and began working as an associate pastor at Calvary Chapel Las Vegas. In 1985, Coy and his wife Diane moved to South Florida where they founded Calvary Chapel Fort Lauderdale.

Resignation and scandals 

In April 2014, Bob Coy resigned as the Senior Pastor and President of Calvary Chapel Fort Lauderdale after admitting to adultery and saying he had an addiction to pornography. Coy spent a year in Chattanooga, Tennessee in that city's Calvary Chapel to undergo a "restoration process," while the church board appointed Doug Sauder to take Coy's position as Senior Pastor. Coy later divorced. He then went on to work as a consultant at The Funky Biscuit in Boca Raton, Florida. In November 2017 they terminated the relationship as a result of the child abuse allegations published in The Miami New Times.

In November 2017, Coy was accused of molesting a child. It began when she was four years old and continued into her teenage years. Coy was fired from his consulting job at a South Florida nightclub, The Funky Biscuit.

Charity work 

Due to a great need for increased services to keep children from entering foster care, in 1997 under the direction of Coy, 4Kids of South Florida was founded to care for orphans and children in the foster-care system in South Florida.

However, Bob Coy's direct involvement with 4Kids cannot be substantiated through Florida's Division of Corporations (Sunbiz) web site, nor other references.

Publications

References

Living people
1955 births
People from Royal Oak, Michigan